is a Welsh hymn, the words of which were written in the 1890s by Daniel James (Gwyrosydd) and sung to a tune by John Hughes. The song was originally written as a hymn, but has become firmly established as a rugby anthem, associated with the Welsh rugby union, being sung before almost every Test match involving the Welsh national team – though more likely to be heard sung at matches involving the Welsh football team in recent years. In 2007 the song was one of the traditional Welsh songs to make it to the screen in an S4C television series , an attempt to bring traditional four-part harmony choral singing back to the Welsh rugby terraces.

In 2012, the Welsh group Only Boys Aloud sang "" on the British ITV show Britain's Got Talent, coming third in the final. It has since become the most watched Welsh-language video on YouTube.

"" is unusual among the most popular Welsh traditional songs in that an English-language version of the words is virtually never sung (unlike, for example), but the tune does appear, for example, in the British Methodist hymn book Hymns and Psalms, set to the lyrics of "I will Sing the Wondrous Story" by P. P. Bliss. The English singing translation by Rees Harris (1874–1954) appeared in The Abingdon Song Book in 1937.

The  Centre is based at  Chapel, the burial place of Daniel James. The chapel and grounds were at the point of dereliction until 2011 but have been restored.

Lyrics 

Alternative words in the Welsh version:
 Verse 1, line 3: 
 Verse 2, line 2: 
 Verse 3, line 2: 
 Chorus, line 3:

Music

Adaptations 

The tune of "" has been adapted to suit other lyrics which fit its 8787.8787 metrical pattern, notably "A Miner's Lifeguard", "Life's Railway to Heaven", "The Weaver's Song" (Almanac Singers), "What a Friend We Have in Jesus", "Here is love vast as the ocean" by William Rees (1802–1883) with elements derived from William Williams (1717–1791).
Faryl Smith recorded a version of the song for her debut album, Faryl.
Katherine Jenkins recorded a version for her album Second Nature.
Siobhan Owen recorded a version with voice and harp, featured on her album Storybook Journey (2012).
Adrian Mitchell has written a translation into English, "Shining Heart", for the show "A Child's Christmas in Wales". The lyrics appear in his collection Love Songs of World War Three.
Wirral-based indie band Half Man Half Biscuit performed a medley of "Calon Lan" and the Beach Boys' "Help Me, Rhonda" at a gig in Cardiff in 2011

References

External links
Learn to sing "Calon Lân" online (S4C 'Codi Canu' Welsh programme site)

Welsh Christian hymns
Hymn tunes
Wales national rugby union team
Welsh patriotic songs